Karine Laurent Philippot (born October 29, 1974 in Mulhouse as Karine Philippot) is a French cross-country skier and non-commissioned officer who has competed since 1994. Her best World Cup finish was second in a 10 km event in China in 2007.

Laurent Philippot also competed in four Winter Olympics, earning her best finish of sixth in the 4 × 5 km relay at Vancouver in 2010. Her best finish at the FIS Nordic World Ski Championships was sixth in the team sprint event at Oberstdorf in 2005.

Cross-country skiing results
All results are sourced from the International Ski Federation (FIS).

Olympic Games

World Championships

a.  Cancelled due to extremely cold weather.

World Cup

Season standings

Individual podiums
 2 podiums – (2 )

Team podiums
 3 podiums – (3 )

References

External links

1974 births
Cross-country skiers at the 1998 Winter Olympics
Cross-country skiers at the 2002 Winter Olympics
Cross-country skiers at the 2006 Winter Olympics
Cross-country skiers at the 2010 Winter Olympics
French female cross-country skiers
Living people
Olympic cross-country skiers of France
Sportspeople from Mulhouse